Kristof Imschoot (born 4 December 1980) is a Belgian footballer who plays as a midfielder for RFC Wetteren. He has also played for Beveren, Lierse, Willem II, KV Mechelen and Dender.

Life and career
Imschoot was born in the city of Dendermonde. He began his professional career with Beveren and made his first team debut during the 1999–2000 season. Two years later, Imschoot joined Lierse and went on to score 14 goals in 110 league appearances in five seasons with the club. He spent the 2006–07 season with Dutch side Willem II and then returned to Belgium to play for KV Mechelen, scoring three goals in 47 league games. Imschoot joined Dender in 2009 and scored 10 goals in 29 appearances during his one season with the club. He moved to Cyprus in 2010 to sign for Enosis Neon Paralimni.

References

External links

1980 births
Living people
People from Dendermonde
Belgian footballers
Association football midfielders
K.S.K. Beveren players
Lierse S.K. players
Willem II (football club) players
K.V. Mechelen players
F.C.V. Dender E.H. players
Enosis Neon Paralimni FC players
Belgian Pro League players
Eredivisie players
Challenger Pro League players
Cypriot First Division players
Belgian expatriate footballers
Expatriate footballers in Cyprus
Footballers from East Flanders